Stock Road is an arterial road in the southern suburbs of Perth, Western Australia. The northern terminus is at Page Street in Attadale, near Point Walter on the Swan River. It runs southwards to Canning Highway and then Leach Highway as a residential road. Beyond Leach Highway, it is part of 
National Route 1, and continues south as a dual carriageway. It ends at Rockingham Road, which runs south as National Route 1 towards Rockingham, and north-west towards Fremantle.

Major intersections
All intersections below are controlled by traffic signals unless otherwise indicated.

See also

References

Roads in Perth, Western Australia
Highway 1 (Australia)
Hamilton Hill, Western Australia